KPCV may refer to:

 KPCV (FM), a radio station (91.7 FM) licensed to Portales, New Mexico, United States
 KVLA-FM, a radio station (90.3 FM) licensed to Coachella, California, United States, which held the call sign KPCV from 2008 to 2011